Donald Arthur Anderson (May 1, 1934 – August 12, 2022) was an American politician and businessman.

Anderson was born in Minneapolis, Minnesota, on May 1, 1934. He attended Edison High School in Minneapolis. Anderson lived in Wadena, Minnesota with his wife Violet and his family. One of his children, Mark, also served in the Minnesota Legislature.

He served in the United States Army and was deployed in Germany. Anderson graduated from University of Minnesota with an associate degree and from Augsburg University with his bachelor's degree in business and history, and was involved in the grocery business. He served in the Minnesota Senate from 1983 to 1990 and was a Republican. Anderson died at Northern Lakes Assisted Living in Baxter, Minnesota, on August 12, 2022, at the age of 88.

References

1934 births
2022 deaths
Politicians from Minneapolis
People from Wadena, Minnesota
Military personnel from Minneapolis
Augsburg University alumni
University of Minnesota alumni
Businesspeople from Minnesota
Republican Party Minnesota state senators